Aurora Guerrero is a writer-director from California.

Early life 
Guerrero was born in the Mission District of San Francisco, California to Mexican immigrant parents, later growing up on the border of the cities of Richmond and El Cerrito while working at her parents' small Mexican restaurant in Berkeley. Guerrero studied both Psychology and Chicano studies at the University of California, Berkeley, completing a Bachelor of Arts. She later moved to Los Angeles to study directing at California Institute of the Arts in Santa Clarita, California earning a Master of Fine Arts. Her narrative work often examines the intersection of the working class, queer, and of color.

Career 
Early in her career, she co-founded Womyn Image Makers (WIM) along with Dalila Mendez, Maritza Alvarez and Claudia Mercado. As WIM, in 2005, she directed the short film Pura Lengua, which debuted at the Sundance Film Festival. Her second short film, Viernes Girl, won the 2005 HBO/New York International Latino Film Festival short film competition. Both films caught the attention of film institutions such as Sundance, Tribeca, and Film Independent. Guerrero also went on to assist director Patricia Cardoso on her debut feature Real Women Have Curves, which won the Sundance Film Festival Audience Award in 2002. In 2005 Guerrero was selected as a Sundance Institute Ford Foundation film fellow. While there, she participated in the Native Indigenous Lab with her script for Mosquita y Mari.

In 2012, Guerrero made her feature film debut at the Sundance Film Festival with Mosquita y Mari, becoming the first Chicana filmmaker to debut a feature-length film who was also previously a Sundance Institute and Ford Foundation Fellow. Mosquita y Mari has since traveled over 100 film festivals including San Francisco International, Melbourne, Guadalajara, São Paulo, and has garnered multiple awards including Best First Feature at Outfest and Best U.S. Latino Film at New York's Cinema Tropical while picking up Spirit Award and GLAAD nominations for Best First Feature Under 500k and the Piaget's Producer's Award. The film tells the coming-of-age story of two teen Chicanas in Huntington Park, California who form a relationship ignited by sexual attraction.
Guerrero describes an attraction to speaking about “actual violence within silence,” taboo subjects that are not easily spoken about between parents and children. Guerrero also hoped that LGBT Latino audiences would see themselves validated by the film—much as Guerrero herself felt when, as an undergraduate student, she encountered the work of feminist Chicana writers Gloria E. Anzaldúa and Cherríe Moraga.

In an interview in 2012 at the Torino LGBTQI Film Festival, Guerrero stated that she felt connected to the story in Mosquita y Mari because she “wanted to stay true to her own coming of age experience of exploring her identity. I feel at that age you’re a little more open to life and the people around you end up impacting you because of your openness. These early years are markers of who you will become later on. That is very true of my life and I feel like my friendships, and that friendship in particular that inspired this movie, was the beginnings of my queer identity.” 

In 2014, Guerrero announced her next project, Los Valientes, about a young undocumented Latino gay man living in the U.S. Los Valientes, slated to be Guerrero's second feature, has been awarded two grants by SFF/KRF, a 2014 Sundance Feature Film Development Grant and a 2013 Tribeca Narrative Grant, and was selected to participate in IFP's No Borders Market in 2014.

Most of Guerrero's film work has been centered around California, especially the San Francisco Bay Area where she grew up. Her first work not centered in California was the episode of Queen Sugar she directed, centered in Louisiana.

In 2017, Guerrero directed the Ava DuVernay produced Queen Sugar episode "What Do I Care for Morning" which aired as episode three in season two. DuVernay chose Guerrero for the directorial position because of her work Mosquita y Mari. Based on this film, DuVernay felt confident enough that Guerrero could focus on the power of intimacy, especially for Queen Sugar, a show that focuses so much on family, betrayal and injustice. Prior to directing episode three of season two of Queen Sugar, Guerrero had no idea what episode or what she was going to be directing specifically. Exploring the flirtation, tension, and budding romance of this episode is one of her strengths, and it was a perfect directorial fit for her.

DuVernay later recommended Guerrero to Lin-Manuel Miranda to direct the music video for Andra Day's cover of "Burn" from The Hamilton Mixtape.

Influences 
In a blog post that she wrote on the Sundance Institute website on April 28, 2011 Guerrero writes, "My first inspirations were writers. Women of color feminist writers like Audre Lorde, Cherrie Moraga, Gloria Anzaldúa, Chrystos, June Jordan, and Angela Davis. When I discovered their brave works as a freshman in college, a fierce creative seed was planted in me. It was a calling I had the moment I was stripped naked by their words." Her work showcases the experiences of Chicanas that often echo her own experiences.

In an interview with El Tecolote on April 26, 2012, Guerrero stressed the importance of “opening doors to Latinos, especially women and youth, behind the camera in order to help build a community of Latina/o artists,” something she didn't have when she was a girl. She also stresses the importance of activity in politics and cultural activism.

Awards and nominations
Viernes Girl, HBO/New York International Latino Film Festival (NYILFF) short script competition (2005)
Mosquita y Mari, John Cassavetes Spirit Award Nomination, (2013)

Mosquita y Mari, John Cassavetes Spirit Award for Best First Screenplay, (2013)Mosquita y Mari, Best First Narrative Feature, Outfest (2012)
Mosquita y Mari, Best Narrative Feature, Festival Las Americas, Chicago (2012)
Mosquita y Mari, Best Narrative Feature, Cinefestival (2012)
Mosquita y Mari, Best Screenplay, Santa Fe Independent Film Festival (2012)
Mosquita y Mari, Queer Award, Torino International LGBT Film Festival (2012)
Mosquita y Mari, Audience Award, Pink Film Festival Zurich (2012)
Best Director, awarded to Aurora Guerrero, Long Beach QFilm Festival (2012)
Global Can Award, awarded to Aurora Guerrero, William & Mary Film Festival (2012)

Time Warner/Sundance Storytelling Fellow (2012)

Filmography

See also 
 List of female film and television directors
 List of lesbian filmmakers
 List of LGBT-related films directed by women

References

Further reading 
 Agrawal, Nina. “Arts Innovator: Aurora Guerrero, U.S./Mexico.” Americas Quarterly. Retrieved 2018-11-11.
 Conscious Films. “Aurora Guerrero Bio.” Wixsite. Retrieved 2018-11-11.
 Guerrero, Aurora. “Tglff2012: Aurora Guerrero.” YouTube. Retrieved 2018-11-12.
 Mejia, Paula. “Ava DuVernay Only Wanted Female Directors for ‘Queen Sugar,’ Aurora Guerrero Stepped Up.” Remezcla. Retrieved 2018-11-11.

External links 
 Aurora Guerrero Interview on YouTube

 2012 Aurora Guerrero interview indiewire.com

Living people
American women film directors
American women screenwriters
American film directors of Mexican descent
American lesbian artists
LGBT film directors
American LGBT screenwriters
LGBT Hispanic and Latino American people
LGBT people from California
Screenwriters from California
Film directors from San Francisco
Writers from San Francisco
California Institute of the Arts alumni
University of California, Berkeley alumni
Ford Foundation fellowships
Year of birth missing (living people)